This is a list of census-designated places in Guam. Population data is from the 2010 Census.

Census Designated Places of Guam

See also
Villages of Guam
List of beaches in Guam

References